Molla Mahalleh (also Romanized as Mollā Maḩalleh; also known as Mollā Maḩalleh-ye Pā’īn) is a village in Pir Kuh Rural District, Deylaman District, Siahkal County, Gilan Province, Iran. At the 2006 census, its population was 197, in 60 families.

References 

Populated places in Siahkal County